Azwell is a small unincorporated community in Okanogan County, Washington, United States.

History
Azwell is named for its founder, Alfred Z. Wells (Alfred Z. Wells). Wells and his nephew Alfred Morris were owners of a hardware store in Wenatchee, and entered the orchard business in the area that would become Azwell. Their partnership was discontinued in 1941, Alfred Wells kept the orchard and Azwell became a company community with several year round residents.

As of 1953, the town comprised about 300 acres of apple and peach orchards, a fruit packing warehouse, and a grocery store with a population of about 20 families living in Azwell year-round.

Geography
Azwell is located at  (47.94008, -119.88245).

The community is located on the Columbia River, below Wells Dam. Azwell is 6 miles south of Pateros, Washington and 60 miles north of Wenatchee, Washington.

References

External links
 Azwell page on GhostTownsUSA.com

Unincorporated communities in Okanogan County, Washington
Unincorporated communities in Washington (state)
Populated places in the Okanagan Country